Mill Creek is a stream in Oregon County, Missouri and Randolph County, Arkansas. It is a tributary of the Eleven Point River.

Mill Creek was so named due to the presence of several gristmills along its course.

See also
List of rivers of Arkansas
List of rivers of Missouri

References

Rivers of Randolph County, Arkansas
Rivers of Oregon County, Missouri
Rivers of Arkansas
Rivers of Missouri